"Overnight Success" is a song written by Sanger D. Shafer and recorded by American country music artist George Strait.  It was released in November 1989 as the fourth and final single from his album Beyond the Blue Neon.

Chart performance
"Overnight Success" peaked at number 8 on the Billboard Hot Country Singles and number 7 on RPM Country Tracks. This was the first single of Strait's to miss number one since "You're Something Special  to Me" in 1986, and broke Strait's string of 11 consecutive number one country hits. The song's B-side, "Hollywood Squares", spent five weeks on the Hot Country Singles charts and peaked at number 67 based on unsolicited airplay

Year-end charts

References

1989 singles
George Strait songs
Songs written by Sanger D. Shafer
Song recordings produced by Jimmy Bowen
MCA Records singles
1989 songs